Heart Presents a Lovemongers' Christmas is a Christmas album and the twelfth studio album by American rock band Heart. It was originally released under the title Here Is Christmas on October 20, 1998, by 2b Music, serving as the second album of the Lovemongers, a side project involving Ann and Nancy Wilson, their longtime friend and collaborator Sue Ennis and Frank Cox.

On November 20, 2001, Beyond Music re-released Here Is Christmas as a Heart album with the same track listing and new artwork. The album was reissued on November 16, 2004, by Sovereign Artists with a different cover and two bonus tracks—"Mary" and 	"Let's Stay In".

Track listing

Personnel
Credits adapted from the liner notes of Heart Presents a Lovemongers' Christmas and its 2004 reissue.

Lovemongers
 Ann Wilson
 Nancy Wilson
 Sue Ennis
 Frank Cox
 Ben Smith

Additional musicians
 Brad Allison – flugelhorn, piccolo trumpet
 Dewey Marler – clarinet, flute
 Mary Frank – concert harp
 Probyn Gregory – flugelhorn (2004 reissue)
 Craig Bartock – additional guitars on "Mary" and "Let's Stay In"

Technical
 Lovemongers – production
 Daniel Mendez – engineering
 Sig Skaylan – second engineer
 Eric Oz – second engineer
 Mark Guenther – mastering at Seattle Disc Mastering (2001 release)
 Craig Bartock – engineering (2004 reissue)
 Ghian Wright – second engineer (2004 reissue); production on "Mary" and "Let's Stay In"
 Nancy Wilson – production on "Mary" and "Let's Stay In"

Artwork
 Klaus Whitley – album art, design, back cover photo (2004 reissue)
 Nancy Wilson – cover photo (2004 reissue)

Notes

References

2001 Christmas albums
Beyond Records albums
Christmas albums by American artists
Heart (band) albums